Stanley K. Abe is an art historian with Duke University and a specialist in Chinese art and Buddhist art. He received his BA, MA, and PhD from the University of California at Berkeley. His book Ordinary images (2002) won the Freer Gallery/Smithsonian Institution: Shimada Prize.

Selected publications
 
Ordinary images. University of Chicago Press, Chicago, 2002. 
A Freer stela reconsidered. Freer Gallery of Art and Arthur M. Sackler Gallery Occasional Paper, 2002.
"To avoid the inscrutable: Abstract Expressionism and the "Oriental Mode"." In Discrepant Abstraction, Ed. K. Mercer, MIT Press, 2006. pp. 52–73.

References

External links
Stanley Abe talking on "Sculpture in the Golden Age of East Asian Art Collecting"

Year of birth missing (living people)
Living people
American art historians
Duke University faculty
University of California, Berkeley alumni
Historians of East Asian art